Robert Charles Hosker (born 27 February 1955) is an English former professional footballer who played as a winger in the Football League for York City, in non-League football for Boston United and was on the books of Middlesbrough without making a league appearance. After Boston he go to Belgium and play by Racing Jet de Bruxelles in Division one (68/3), Division two and three, and stop after fusion in 1988.

References

1955 births
Living people
People from Cannock
English footballers
Association football wingers
Middlesbrough F.C. players
York City F.C. players
Boston United F.C. players
English Football League players